"Nobody Said It Was Easy (Lookin' For The Lights)" is a song by American rock band LeRoux. It was released as a single in 1982 from their album Last Safe Place.

The song peaked at No. 18 on the Billboard Hot 100, becoming the band's only top 40 hit.

Chart performance

See also
List of one-hit wonders in the United States

References

1982 singles
1982 songs
RCA Records singles